Bracken House may refer to:
Bracken House, Ball State University
Bracken House, London